NAPSA Stars is a Zambian football club based in Lusaka that plays in the Zambia Super League. They play their home games at Heroes Stadium in Lusaka.

Previously known as Profund Warriors, the club is named after and sponsored by the National Pension Scheme Authority (NAPSA).

Honours
Zambian Barclays Cup (1): 2012
 ABSA Cup 2022
CAF Confederations qualification (1): 2020

References

External links
 

Football clubs in Zambia
Sport in Lusaka